Jesse Appleton (November 17, 1772November 12, 1819) was the second president of Bowdoin College and the father of First Lady Jane Pierce.

Early life
Appleton was born on November 17, 1772 in New Ipswich, New Hampshire. He was the son of Francis Appleton (1733–1816) and Elizabeth (née Hubbard) Appleton (1730–1815).

He graduated from Dartmouth College in Hanover, New Hampshire in 1792.

Career

After graduating from Dartmouth, Appleton taught at several institutions including Amherst College and then worked at a parish in Hampton, New Hampshire. In the early 19th century, he received the honorary degree of Doctor of Divinity from both Dartmouth and Harvard University. In 1807, he was appointed president of Bowdoin, where he remained until he died of tuberculosis in 1819. A congregationalist minister and prominent Christian lecturer, Appleton was notably determined to make Bowdoin students more pious. He worked at the school, right before it reached its full prominence in the 1820s, when Nathaniel Hawthorne, Henry Wadsworth Longfellow, and Franklin Pierce attended.

He was elected a Fellow of the American Academy of Arts and Sciences in 1810, and was elected a member of the American Antiquarian Society in 1813.

Personal life

He married Elizabeth Means (1779–1844). Elizabeth was the daughter of Stewartstown, County Tyrone, Ireland born Robert Means (1742–1823) and Mary McGregor (1752–1838).  His wife's sister, Mary Means (1777–1858), was married to Jeremiah Mason on November 6, 1799. Together, Jesse and Elizabeth were the parents of five children who survived through infancy, including:

 Mary Means Appleton (1801–1883), who married John Aiken (1797–1867)
 Frances Appleton (1804–1839), who married famed Bowdoin professor Alpheus Spring Packard, Sr. (1798–1884) who edited The Works of Rev. Jesse Appleton, D.D., with a Memoir of His Life and Character in 1837.
 Jane Means Appleton (1806–1863), who would become First Lady to President Franklin Pierce on November 19, 1834.
 William Appleton (1808–1830), who died unmarried.
 John Appleton (1814–1817), who died young.

Appleton died on November 12, 1819 in Brunswick, Maine. He is interred at Pine Grove Cemetery in Brunswick.

Descendants
Through his daughter Mary, he was the grandfather of William Appleton Aiken (1833–1929), who in 1861 married Eliza Coit Buckingham (1838–1924), and Mary Appleton Aiken, who in 1868 married Francis H. Snow (1840–1908), a professor and chancellor of the University of Kansas who became prominent through the discovery of a fungus fatal to chinch bugs and its propagation and distribution.

Through his daughter Frances, he was the grandfather of four boys and one girl, including William Alfred Packard (1830-1909), an 1851 alumnus of Bowdoin, Alpheus Spring Packard Jr. (1839–1905), a Civil War surgeon, entomologist who corresponded with Charles Darwin, Charles A. Packard, George Packard, and Frances Appleton Packard.

Through his daughter Jane, he was the grandfather of Franklin Pierce, Jr. (1836–1836), who died young, Franklin "Frank" Robert Pierce (1839–1843), who died at age four from epidemic typhus, and Benjamin Pierce (1841–1853), who died two months before Pierce's inauguration as president when the passenger car of the train they were traveling in broke loose and rolled down an embankment.

References
Notes

Sources

External links
 
 Jesse Appleton Collection at Bowdoin Library (with biographical information)
 Jesse Appleton, Lectures, delivered at Bowdoin college, and occasional sermons, 1822 (at Google Books)
 Jesse Appleton, An address, delivered before the Massachusetts Society for Suppressing Intemperance: at their anniversary meeting, May 31, 1816, 1816.

1772 births
1819 deaths
Appleton family
People of colonial New Hampshire
People from New Ipswich, New Hampshire
Amherst College faculty
Dartmouth College alumni
Fellows of the American Academy of Arts and Sciences
Members of the American Antiquarian Society
Presidents of Bowdoin College
Burials at Pine Grove Cemetery (Brunswick, Maine)